Kendallville Municipal Airport (C62) is a public airport  north of Kendallville, in Noble County, Indiana. The airport was founded in November 1946.

References

External links 

Airports in Indiana
Buildings and structures in Noble County, Indiana
Transportation in Noble County, Indiana
Airports established in 1946
1946 establishments in Indiana